= Cambodia National and Provincial Resources Data Bank =

The Cambodia National and Provincial Resources Data Bank is an online collection of data about Cambodia. It was prepared by the Cambodian Ministry of Commerce with funding from the World Bank and is designed to be accessible to entrepreneurs and investors. It includes information related to human resources, education, business, tourism, culture, environment, geology, infrastructure, transport, international trade, agriculture, investment, and geography.
